Ratchet may refer to:

Devices 
 Ratchet (device), a mechanical device that allows movement in only one direction
 Ratchet, metonomic name for a socket wrench incorporating a ratcheting device
 Ratchet (instrument), a  musical instrument and a warning device

Film and television 
 Ratchet (Robots), a character in the film Robots
 Ratchet, a character in the Widget the World Watcher television series
 Ratchet, a character in the Red Lantern Corps DC Comics series
 Ratchet (Transformers), a character
 Ratchet, one of the Autobot Transformers
 Ratchet, a 1986 thriller film by John Johnson

Video games 
 Ratchet (Ratchet & Clank), a video game character
 Ratchet: Deadlocked, a video game

Music 
 "Ratchet" (Bloc Party song), 2013
 Ratchet (Shamir album), 2015
 Ratchet, another name for the RnBass genre

Other 
 Ratchet option, a financial derivative also known as cliquet option
 Double Ratchet Algorithm, an algorithm for managing cryptographic keys
 Ratchet (slang), a derogatory term
 Ratchet Gearloose, a Disney character, paternal grandfather of Gyro Gearloose

See also 
Nurse Ratched
 Ratched (TV series)